The Colonial Life Arena is a multi-purpose arena in Columbia, South Carolina, primarily home to the University of South Carolina men's and women's basketball teams. Opened as a replacement for the Carolina Coliseum with the name Carolina Center in 2002, the 18,000-seat arena is also host to various events, including conferences, concerts, and graduation ceremonies. It is the largest arena in the state of South Carolina and the eighth largest campus college arena.

The naming rights were acquired in 2003 by Unum, a Portland, Maine–based insurance company, and it was renamed to the Colonial Center after the Colonial Life & Accident Insurance Company, a Unum subsidiary headquartered in Columbia. On July 22, 2008, the USC board approved renaming the building to the Colonial Life Arena as part of the rebranding by Unum (which by then had moved to Chattanooga, Tennessee) of Colonial Life & Accident as Colonial Life.

History and use

The arena first opened on November 22, 2002, with the season opener of the South Carolina women's basketball team. A near sell-out crowd of 17,712 fans saw the 72–58 Gamecocks victory over in-state rival Clemson, with a $1 admission charge, at that time commonly used by the women's basketball team to promote major games. The official grand opening took place December 2, 2002. The men's basketball team defeated Temple 66–47. On January 26, 2010 South Carolina defeated #1 ranked and undefeated Kentucky 68–62 in the arena, one of the biggest wins in South Carolina history.

On January 18, 2021, as part of the university's observance of Martin Luther King Day, the university dedicated a statue of Gamecocks great and 2020 WNBA MVP A'ja Wilson near the arena's main entrance.

Aside from Gamecock basketball, the Colonial Life Arena also hosts the South Carolina High School Basketball Championships each year. The facility is built to also host ice hockey games, and was intended to be the new home of the ECHL's Columbia Inferno.  However, due to legal issues with the funding for the facility, the Inferno never played there.  The franchise suspended operations in 2008, but after plans for a new arena in neighboring Lexington County fell through, the franchise was finally canceled in 2014.

The Colonial Life Arena was ranked 22nd in the world in ticket sales in 2003. It was also ranked the #1 arena in the Carolinas and was the #2 rated university arena in the world in 2005, based on ticket sales for touring shows.

It is managed by Spectra (formerly Global Spectrum), the facilities management subsidiary of Comcast Spectacor.  The NBA's Philadelphia 76ers, then owned by Comcast Spectacor, played an exhibition game in the venue in October 2005.

In 2007, it was home to the Columbia Stingers of the National Indoor Football League. The arena has hosted the Charlotte Bobcats and New York Knicks in the past.

Originally, the venue, like all Comcast-Spectator managed facilities, had its own ticketing policy, and therefore concerts were not controlled by the major ticketing industry firms.

Ticketing was provided by New Era Tickets, and tickets could be purchased through the Arena's website.

Ticketing for events at the arena is now provided through Ticketmaster.

Non-basketball events
Other events held at the Arena have included Disney on Ice, High School Musical: The Concert, Sesame Street, American Idols Live!, Trans-Siberian Orchestra every December since 2005, Ringling Brothers and Barnum and Bailey Circus (until 2017), the Christian music Winter Jam, ventriloquist Jeff Dunham, WWE Raw and SmackDown, PBR Velocity Tour (2019 and 2021), AEW Dynamite and Rampage.

Concerts
Artists that have performed at the arena over the past 20 years include: James Brown, The Eagles in '03, Cher, Billy Joel (in '03 and '07), Elton John (4x in '03,'05,'19, and '22). Bruce Springsteen & The E Street Band (who played the first ever show at the Arena, on December 9, Note: James Brown actually played first for boosters on opening night November 2002), Prince & The New Power Generation twice (in 2004 and in 2011), Olivia Newton-John in '03, Aerosmith in 2004, Jimmy Buffett 4x (in '04,'10), James Taylor in 2015,'19, and '22; Paul McCartney in '15, Def Leppard with Foreigner in '15, Journey with Steve Miller Band in '15, Stevie Nicks with The Pretenders in '16, KISS with David Lee Roth in '20, Cheap Trick in '04, Mötley Crüe in '06, Van Zant. Britney Spears in 2004 with Kelis, John Mayer in 2007, Miley Cyrus with Metro Station in 2009, Taylor Swift 4x (with Rascal Flatts in '08, 2010, with SC's Needtobreathe in 2011, with Ed Sheeran in 2013), Justin Bieber in 2013, Bruno Mars in 2014, Maroon 5 (in '07 and 2016 w/Tove Lo), Ariana Grande in 2019, Pink in 2019; Shania Twain in '04, Thomas Rhett, Florida Georgia Line, Craig Morgan, Blake Shelton with Luke Bryan in 2010, Carrie Underwood a few times (in '06 and 2013), Kenny Chesney (in '04, 2011,2015), Zac Brown Band in 2012, Eric Church in 2012, Dierks Bentley with Miranda Lambert and Lee Brice in 2013; Jason Aldean in 2014 and '20, Charleston's Darius Rucker 3x (in 2014,2017,and '22), Morgan Wallen in '22. R. Kelly 4x, Usher in 2011 with Akon, Chris Brown in 2014, The Weeknd w/Gucci Mane in 2017, B2K, Lil Jon, Soulja Boy, Jamie Foxx, Trey Songz, Janet Jackson in '17, Mary J. Blige, Coolio, Lil Wayne, Kanye West in 2004, Drake with Kendrick Lamar in 2012, T.I. in 2013 with Jeezy, Cardi B with Offset in 2019, Post Malone in 2020, Lil Baby in '21, DaBaby in 2022, Nelly in '22, Pitbull in '22. Skillet, Nickelback with Chevelle and Trapt in 2006, Pearl Jam twice (first with Kings of Leon in 2008, and in 2016), Red Hot Chili Peppers twice (in 2012 and 2017), Foo Fighters with The Struts in 2017, Imagine Dragons in 2018 (and '22), Weezer in 2019, and Five Finger Death Punch with Three Days Grace in 2019. Columbia's Hootie & the Blowfish came to the Colonial in fall 2019 with the Barenaked Ladies for 3 nights. Kanye West's return to Colonial Life Arena (part of his Saint Pablo Tour) in December 2016 was cancelled, and The Chainsmokers concert (part of their Memories Do Not Open Tour) in May 2017 was cancelled. The 2020 Millennium Tour in July with Ashanti and Bow Wow was postponed to November 2021 due to COVID-19. The first event to be held at the Colonial since COVID started in March 2020, was the annual Monster Jam on April 9, 2021. On April 16, the Colonial hosted a comedy tour with Mike Epps and DC Young Fly.

Britney Spears 2004 The Onyx Hotel Tour

Taylor Swift 2011 Speak Now World Tour

Drake 2012 Club Paradise Tour

Nickelback 2006 All The Right Reasons Tour

Pearl Jam 2008 Pearl Jam 2008 United States Tour 

Red Hot Chili Peppers 2012 I'm with You World Tour

Foo Fighters 2017 Concrete and Gold Tour

Aerosmith 2004 Honkin' on Bobo Tour

Prince 2004 Musicology Live 2004ever

Elton John 2005 Peachtree Road Tour

On June 25, 2015, Paul McCartney performed at the Colonial Life Arena as part of his 2015 Out There tour. The June 25 show was Paul's first performance in Columbia since he played Williams-Brice Stadium on May 7, 1993 as part of his The New World Tour.

On December 3, 2019, Ariana Grande performed at the Colonial Life Arena as part of her Sweetener World Tour.

Other events
The University of South Carolina holds most of its commencement exercises in the Colonial Life Arena. The first commencement speaker for ceremonies at the Colonial Center was President George W. Bush in 2003.

On June 28, 2007, selected contestants from Dancing With The Stars performed dances, as part of their summer tour.

On December 9, 2007, a rally for Barack Obama was scheduled to be held at the arena. Because the rally also featured Oprah Winfrey, tickets to the event sold out days before the rally. The rally was eventually moved to nearby Williams-Brice Stadium.

See also
 List of NCAA Division I basketball arenas
 List of indoor arenas in the United States

References

External links

2002 establishments in South Carolina
Basketball venues in South Carolina
College basketball venues in the United States
Indoor arenas in South Carolina
Indoor ice hockey venues in the United States
South Carolina Gamecocks
South Carolina Gamecocks basketball venues
Sports venues completed in 2002